Rifaina is a municipality in the state of São Paulo in Brazil. The population is 3,640 (2020 est.) in an area of 163 km². The elevation is 575 m.

References

Municipalities in São Paulo (state)